François Giuliani (5 August 1938, Algiers - 22 June 2009, Bruges) was an Algerian journalist and publicist. In 1961 he joined the staff of Reuters, working for them as a news correspondent and reporter in both Africa and London for ten years. In 1971 he joined the United Nations Press Section where he worked for over twenty years. In 1992 he transferred to the United Nations Department of Public Information. In 1996 he left the U.N. to become the Director of Press and Public Relations at the Metropolitan Opera where he served until his retirement in 2006.

1938 births
2009 deaths
Algerian journalists
20th-century journalists
21st-century Algerian people